is a song by Japanese pop rock duo Garnidelia. It was first released digitally on July 28, 2016 as the B-side to its advance single, "Yakusoku -Promise Code-". Despite not being used as an official single by itself, the song gained far more popularity than the single itself, considering the music dance video of this song hit 62 million on YouTube as of June 7, 2020. The song received tremendous popularity in mainland China, leading to a great number of song and dance covers on YouTube and Bilibili.

Background and release

In interview with Asianbeat on 12 December 2016, MARiA stated that she want to make a song with a Japanese style, and try to find the good timing to make that. When "Yakusoku -Promise Code-" is announced to be used as the ending theme song of anime Qualidea Code, She stated she inspired with the character in the anime that used Japanese Sword, and she was thinking if the costume of the song is using Japanese style. with that thing already settle, the song finally make with using combination of dance and Japanese style, with the costume being designed by Her and Her team, and Choreography is made by Miume. The music dance video of the song was released on April 25, 2016, and the song was released digitally on July 28, 2016, before a physical release as the B-side to its advance single, "Yakusoku -Promise Code-" on August 17, 2016. The song is featured in their second album "Violet Cry", and also featured in their second compilation eurodance-style album .

Music video and reception
The music dance video features MARiA, Miume, and Nina as the dancers, with the costumes based on Japanese style. Dancers from around the world cover the dance and upload their own renditions on YouTube, Bilibili, and Niconico. The phenomenon caused Garnidelia to be invited to perform in Bilibili Macro Link in 2017, 2018, and 2019.  The Chinese boyband X Nine covered the song at their concert in Shanghai on April 2, 2017.

Personnel
Garnidelia
MARiA – vocals, dancer
toku  – music, record

Others
G.A.Cool – Bass
Miume – Dancer, Choreographer
Moririn  – Editor
Mini – Logo Design
Tommy – Assistant

Production
toku – record, mixer
Hidekazu Sakai – mastering

References

Garnidelia songs
2016 singles
MARiA
Japanese songs
2016 songs
Internet memes introduced in 2016